Sciapodini is a tribe of flies in the family Dolichopodidae.

Genera
Bickelia Grichanov, 1996
Condylostylus Bigot, 1859
Dytomyia Bickel, 1994
Helixocerus Lamb, 1929
Mascaromyia Bickel, 1994
Narrabeenia Bickel, 1994
Naufraga Bickel, 1992
Pilbara Bickel, 1994
Sciapus Zeller, 1842
Sinosciapus Yang, 2001

References 

Sciapodinae
Diptera tribes